

Legend

List

References

1975-85